Noel Alí Chama Almazán (born 15 September 1997) is a Mexican racewalking athlete. He qualified to represent Mexico at the 2020 Summer Olympics in Tokyo 2021, competing in men's 20 kilometres walk.

References

External links
 

 

1997 births
Living people
Mexican male racewalkers
Athletes (track and field) at the 2020 Summer Olympics
Olympic athletes of Mexico
Sportspeople from the State of Mexico
Athletes (track and field) at the 2014 Summer Youth Olympics
21st-century Mexican people